Doctors is a British medical soap opera which began broadcasting on BBC One on 26 March 2000. Set in the fictional West Midlands town of Letherbridge, the soap follows the lives of the staff and patients of the Riverside Health Centre and the Best Practice, two fictional NHS doctor's surgeries. The following is a list of characters that first appeared in Doctors in 2001 and 2002, by order of first appearance. All characters were introduced by the programme's executive producer, Mal Young. Nurse Faith Walker (Eva Fontaine) was introduced in May 2001. She was followed by three more regulars who were simultaneously introduced in September 2001; doctors Ben Kwarme (Ariyon Bakare) and Jude Carlyle (Natalie J. Robb) and receptionist Katrina Bullen (Tabitha Wady). Tom Butcher joined the cast in November 2001 as doctor Marc Eliot. Then, in September 2002, Laurence Penry-Jones and Ela Kay joined the cast as doctor Oliver Berg and receptionist Carolina Shaw, respectively. Additionally, multiple other characters appeared throughout the year.

Faith Walker

Faith Walker, portrayed by Eva Fontaine, first appeared on 11 May 2001 and made her final appearance on 19 June 2006. Faith was introduced as a talkative and kind nurse at the Riverside Health Centre. Faith's BBC Online profile described her as "a talented and popular nurse" who had a "disastrous love life". Her romances see her have a one-night stand with Marc Eliot (Tom Butcher) as well as being hurt when Ben Kwarme (Ariyon Bakare) cannot commit to her. She is then raped by Liam McGuire (Tim Matthews) and has an abortion after she falls pregnant with his baby.

Faith falls in love with a fireman called Jerry and the pair eventually married. After getting into debt and losing their home, they both take second jobs. Jerry gets involved with a drugs gang and is shot and killed in a siege at Riverside. She is compensated by the gang for his death and Faith manages to clear her debts. Later, Faith is diagnosed with retinitis pigmentosa and is told she will eventually lose her eyesight. Eventually unable to do her job, she hands her job over to Michelle Corrigan (Donnaleigh Bailey). Faith falls in love with a man named Paul, and after finding out that she was pregnant, they leave to travel the world before her eyesight fails.

For her portrayal of Faith, Fontaine received a nomination for the British Soap Award for Best Actress in 2006.

Ben Kwarme

Dr. Ben Kwarme, portrayed by Ariyon Bakare, first appeared on 3 September 2001 and made his final appearance on 13 June 2001. Ben was introduced as a general practitioner at the Riverside Health Centre who had been working there for six weeks prior to his onscreen debut. Ben's BBC Online profile described him as "a dedicated doctor with a colourful love life and a fiery temper". Shortly after joining the practice, Ben begins a relationship with Faith Walker (Eva Fontaine) but could not commit to her. After she is raped by Liam McGuire (Tim Matthews), he defends her and is almost charged for assault after he attacks Liam. On a night out with Faith, Ben disturbs an intruder and beats him up. The burglar presses charges for grievous bodily harm, but Ben evades conviction. 

Ben has an affair with colleague Kali Hamanda (Nicole Arumugam); however, their relationship is "put under strain as Kali is involved in a shocking accident". He later has a short-lived relationship with another colleague, Oliver Berg (Laurence Penry-Jones). Oliver tries repeatedly to ask Ben out, who declines his advances, but the pair eventually do get into a relationship. Shortly after getting together, Oliver's flatmate, receptionist Carolina Shaw (Ela Kay), dies in an oil tanker explosion and Oliver leaves Letherbridge.

Ben later forms a romantic attraction to Jude Carlyle (Natalie J. Robb), who he proposes to after he learns that she is pregnant with a baby with Down's syndrome, wanting to support them both. Jude declines his proposal, knowing that she does not truly love Ben. In 2004, writers introduced Nathan Bailey (Akemnji Ndifornyen) as the estranged son of Ben. He initially hides his identity, wanting to get to know Ben first, but after he reveals himself as Ben's son, the pair form a "a difficult and tempestuous relationship" which evolves to be a close relationship. Ben eventually leaves Letherbridge with Nathan when the pair go travelling.

For his portrayal of Ben, Bakare received a nomination for the British Soap Award for Best Actor in 2004 and 2005.

Katrina Bullen

Katrina Bullen, portrayed by Tabitha Wady, first appeared on 3 September 2001 and made her final appearance on 22 May 2002. Katrina was introduced as a receptionist that was hired at the Riverside Health Centre following Joanna Helm (Sarah Manners) and Candy Williams (Leanne Wilson) departing. She comes into the practice wanting to take charge and make numerous changes, such as having a noticeboard full of staff photos, which annoys Mac McGuire (Christopher Timothy). She also lectures Dr. Jude Carlyle (Natalie J. Robb) on the importance of seeing patients as quickly as possible to save time, who responds by saying that she will not rush with patients for Katrina's sake.

Jude Carlyle

Dr. Jude Carlyle, portrayed by Natalie J. Robb, first appeared on 3 September 2001 and made her last appearance on 19 March 2004. Jude originates from a working class, Glasgow background and had experience as a police surgeon prior to her being hired at the Riverside Health Centre. Her BBC Online profile stated that Jude has wild impulses and is "attracted to the dark and the dangerous". Also prior to her arrival, she had been married twice but sees both marriages as big mistakes. The second marriage lasted six weeks when Jude discovered her husband having sex with her sister, Beth (Valerie Gogan).

Jude's exit storyline sees her cheat on her boyfriend with his father and she gets pregnant. When the man's wife discovers the affair, she pushes Jude down the stairs. The baby is unharmed but she later learns that they have Down's syndrome. When Ben Kwarme (Ariyon Bakare) learns of the baby's diagnosis, he proposes to Jude to support the pair of them. However, she knows that she does not love him and rejects him. She later moves back to Glasgow to be with her family.

Years after her exit from Doctors, Robb admitted that she did not know how she coped on the series due to the medical terminology. She surprised herself when her brain "managed to take in all the information of the doctor jargon". However, she used her knowledge and experience from Doctors when she came into contact with a pregnant woman in labour who had collapsed and was bleeding. On the experience, Robb explained: "She was really panicking about losing the baby, obviously. For some reason, maybe because of Doctors, I was very calm."

Marc Eliot

Dr. Marc Eliot, portrayed by Tom Butcher, first appeared on 5 October 2001 and made his final appearance on 16 December 2005. His BBC Online profile explained that prior to his arrival in Letherbridge, Marc was a major in the Royal Army Medical Corps and served in Kosovo. Upon his hiring at the Riverside Health Centre, he is suffering from post-traumatic stress disorder. The profile described him as a "highly ambitious" ambitious character and noted that he has plans to take over Riverside. However, after he learns that Mac McGuire (Christopher Timothy) does not plan to retire, he enlists Helen Thompson's (Corrinne Wicks) help in setting up a rival practice, Best Practice.

Marc has a one-night stand with Faith Walker (Eva Fontaine) and their interactions become awkward. However, after she is raped by Liam McGuire (Tim Matthews), she turns to Marc for support and he helps her. Marc also has a one night stand with Helen on the night of her husband's death. The two decide to stay friends and when Marc is accused of raping a patient, Helen secures the evidence which exonerate him from the accusations. Marc and Helen eventually begin a romantic relationship, but when Marc is asked by his brother Robert (Josh Neale) to help build orphanages in Kosovo, Helen insists that he goes as it will benefit him. Marc returns over a year later with a new fiancé, but he soon realises that he still loves Helen. Helen tells Marc that the love is requited and the pair move to Leeds together.

Oliver Berg
Dr. Oliver Berg, portrayed by Laurence Penry-Jones, first appeared on 2 September 2002 and made his final appearance on 13 June 2003. His backstory involves coming from a Jewish family in Nottingham and studying at Bristol University Medical School. He starts at the Riverside Health Centre as a doctor with Ben Kwarme (Ariyon Bakare) as his mentor. Oliver's BBC Online profile stated that Ben is "enthusiastic and full of ideas but his inexperience often trip him up". Oliver is gay, which the team discover when he kisses a drunk, sleeping Ben. He gets into a relationship with physiotherapist Alex, but Oliver's romantic feelings for Ben make the pair split up. Oliver tries repeatedly to ask Ben out, who declines his advances, but the pair eventually do get into a relationship. Shortly after getting together, Oliver's flatmate, receptionist Carolina Shaw (Ela Kay), dies in an oil tanker explosion. Feeling ridden with guilt, Oliver leaves Letherbridge.

Carolina Shaw
Carolina Shaw, portrayed by Ela Kay, first appeared on 18 September 2002 and made her final appearance on 12 June 2003. Carolina was introduced as a receptionist at the Riverside Health Centre and is the flatmate of Oliver Berg (Laurence Penry-Jones). Carolina does not get off to a good start with Faith Walker (Eva Fontaine) after they both audition for a charity show and Carolina wins the part. Kay said "there is a horrible tension between them when Carolina turns up at the surgery." An Inside Soap writer stated that Carolina was hiding something and Kay revealed that her character had a secret daughter, who she gave birth to when she was fifteen. Kay said that Carolina regrets getting pregnant, but did not regret having her daughter. She added that viewers would know Carolina's secret, but her colleagues at the surgery would not. At the 2003 British Soap Awards, Kay was nominated for the British Soap Award for Best Newcomer, as well as the award for Hero of the Year. In an interview with Worcester News, Kay's mother confirmed that Kay was set to depart from the cast of Doctors at the end of May 2003, but did not specify any of her exit details. Carolina dies in scenes aired on 12 June 2003 after sustaining injuries caused by an oil tanker explosion.

Other characters

References

Doctors
Doctors
2001
, Doctors
, Doctors